Reece Earsal Morrison (born October 21, 1945) is a former American football running back who played six seasons in the National Football League with the Cleveland Browns and Cincinnati Bengals. He was drafted by the Cleveland Browns in the third round of the 1968 NFL Draft. He played college football at Texas State University and attended San Marcos High School in San Marcos, Texas.

References

External links
Just Sports Stats

Living people
1945 births
Players of American football from Oklahoma
American football running backs
Texas State Bobcats football players
Cleveland Browns players
Cincinnati Bengals players
Sportspeople from Tulsa, Oklahoma